Shrimant Sardar Khande Rao Holkar Subedar Bahadur (1798 - 22 February 1807), belonging to the Holkar dynasty of the Marathas was the Maharaja of Indore (r. 1799 - 1806). He was born in Poona in 1798, as posthumous son of Malhar Rao II Holkar.

He died from cholera at Shahpur, near Kotah on 22 February 1807.

References

See also
Holkar

1798 births
1807 deaths
Maharajas of Indore